Gwai is a village in the province of Matabeleland South, Zimbabwe. It is located around 135 km north-west of Bulawayo. The village is named after the local river and is derived from the Ndebele word meaning tobacco. The Gwai River Inn was a popular stop on the road between Bulawayo and Victoria Falls, but is now a shell following its destruction in a fire.

Populated places in Matabeleland South Province